Brzeźno (/b̥ʁøzn/) is one of the quarters of the city of Gdańsk, Poland with a sandy beach and 130 m long pier.

Location 

The north of the quarter is bordered by the Bay of Gdańsk. From the east, it is bordered by the suburbs of Nowy Port and Letnica, from the south by Wrzeszcz Dolny and from the west by Zaspa-Rozstaje and Przymorze Wielkie.

Ronald Reagan Park is nearby.

Etymology 

There are numerous speculations surrounding the name "Brzeźno". According to one, the word "Brzeźno" was the name of a lake, with the possessive suffix -no, added to brzoza (birch). Thus, the name of the lake derives from birch trees surrounding its waters. The lake was located by the settlement named Prusęcino (deriving from the Old Prussians that lived there). It is believed that Prusęcino changed its name to Bresno (first noted in 1323). Due to the double-meaning of the name Bresno, the name of the lake was changed to Zaspa. The other hypothesis for the naming of the settlement derives from the word brzeg (Polish: coast), in regards to the coastal location of Brzeźno.

Tourism 

Tourist attractions:
 Brzeźno Pier
Fortifications from the nineteenth and twentieth-century
Guarded beach
Bicycle route to Sopot
Brzeźno Park
Two abele trees – natural monuments, located by the crossroad of Południowa and Pułaska Street.

Gallery

References 

Districts of Gdańsk